The Oppenheim family is a German Jewish banking family which founded what was Europe's biggest private bank, Sal. Oppenheim. According to Manager Magazin 2008, the Oppenheim family was among the 30 richest families in Germany, with assets over 8 billion Euros.

History of the family and raising to nobility
Salomon Oppenheim founded the banking firm Sal. Oppenheim in the late 18th century. Until its sale in 2009, Sal. Oppenheim was the largest privately owned investment/banking house in Europe, with assets of €348 billion.

The Oppenheim family also co-founded the German Colonia-Versicherung and sold their majority stake for 3 billion DM in 1989. 820 million DM were used to increase the equity of the bank, while the rest (over 2 billion DM) was paid out to the family.

In 1867, the family received nobility in Austria with the title of Baron and a year later, in 1868 they were admitted to nobility of Prussia, also with the title of Freiherr.

Genealogy

 Hertz Salomon Oppenheim, Bonn's court factor and purveyor ⚭ Helene Seligmann
 Salomon Oppenheim junior (1772–1828), founder of the Bank Oppenheim, ⚭ Therese Stein (Deigen Levi) (1775–1842), partner of the bank since 1828
 Charlotte Oppenheim (1802–1836), married to Adolphe Ratisbonne (1801–1861) of the 
  (1824–1915), married to Alexandre Singer (son of ) 
 Louis Ratisbonne (1827–1900)
 Simon von Oppenheim (1803–1880), partner of the bank since 1828, ennobled in Austria in 1867, ⚭ Henriette Obermayer (1812–1885)
 (1831–1909), Protestant since 1859, partner of the bank 1880–1904, ⚭ Amalie Heuser (1835–1903) 
 Ada von Oppenheim (1862–1944), ⚭ Graf Gisbert von Bredow (1859–1924)
 Wolf Ferdinand Alfred Georg von Bredow (1934–1952)
 Wolf Graf von Bredow
 Emmy von Oppenheim (1869–1957) ⚭ Maximilian Graf von Arco-Valley (1849–1911)
 Anton Graf von Arco-Valley (1897–1945)
Maria von Arco-Valley (1935–1987)
Max Joseph von Arco-Valley (1942-1942)
Victoria von Oppenheim (1871-1954) ⚭ Alexander von Frankenberg und Ludwigsdorf (1820-1890) 
Alix-May von Frankenberg und Ludwigsdorf (1907-1979) ⚭ Roland Graf von Faber-Castell (1905-1978) 
Hubertus Graf von Faber-Castell (1934-2007) ⚭ Liselotte Baecker (born 1939) 
Caroline Gräfin von Faber-Castell (born 1961) ⚭ Dr. Michael Gotzens (born 1958)
 Antonia Gotzens 
 Alessandra Gotzens 
 Nicholas Gotzens 
Patrick Graf von Faber-Castell (born 1965) ⚭ Mariella Ahrens (born 1969)
 Lucia von Faber-Castell (born 2007)
 Floria Franziska Gräfin von Faber-Castell (born 1972) ⚭ Donatus Landgrave of Hesse (born 1966)
 Paulina von Hessen
 Moritz von Hessen
 August von Hessen
 Simon von Oppenheim (1864–1932), partner of the bank sice 1893, ⚭ Florence Mathews Hutchins (1868–1935)
 Eberhard (1890–1962), partner of the bank 1922–1932, ⚭ 1) Anneliese Oetker (1904–1989), divorced in 1929; ⚭ 2) Helene Gräfin von Hardenberg (1910–1996)
 Manfred (1924–1996), partner of the bank 1956–1993, ⚭ Carla Siempelkamp (born 1926)
 Nicolaus von Oppenheim (born 1956)
 Laura von Oppenheim
 Franziska von Oppenheim
 Theresa von Oppenheim (born 1995)
 Waldemar von Oppenheim (1894–1952), partner of the bank 1922–1952, ⚭ Gabriele Goldschmidt (1902–1988)
 Karin von Oppenheim (1922–2009), Georg von Ullmann (1922–1972), partner of the bank 1954–1972
 Georg von Ullmann (born 1953) ⚭ Corinna van Meeteren
 Leon von Ullmann
 Béla von Ullmann
 Philip von Ullmann
 Ilona von Ullmann (born 1953) ⚭  (born 1949)
 Caroline Gräfin von Krockow
 Friedrich Carl von Oppenheim (1900–1978), partner of the bank 1929–1978 ⚭ Ruth Freiin von Zedlitz und Leipe (1908–1988)
 Alfred Freiherr von Oppenheim (1934–2005), partner of the bank 1964–1993, ⚭ Jeanne Wahl (born 1941)
 Victoria von Oppenheim ⚭ Aurel Scheibler
 Christopher von Oppenheim (born 1965) ⚭ Gabriele Mittelsten-Scheid
 August von Oppenheim
 Hugo von Oppenheim
 Alexandra von Oppenheim ⚭ Hans-Christoph Scheibler
 Gisela von Oppenheim (1936-2023) ⚭ Guillermo von Sanden (1931-2017)
 Federico von Sanden (born 1969) ⚭ Euphemie Gräfin Zech-Burkesroda (born 1968)
 Felizitas von Sanden (born 1999)
 Karl von Sanden (born 2001)
 Christian von Sanden (born 1973) ⚭ Janina Becker (born 1972)
 Pia von Sanden (born 2006)
 Maximilian von Sanden (born 2009)
 Friedrich Carl von Oppenheim (born 1937) ⚭ 1) Loyse de Rham (killed in an accident); 2) Marie-Rose von Merey, gesch. van Exter
 Leonie von Oppenheim ⚭ Charles Booth-Clibborn
 Simon von Oppenheim (born 1970)
 Ludmilla von Oppenheim
 Waldemar von Oppenheim
 Florian von Oppenheim (born 1974)
  (1834–1912), catholic since 1858, partner of the bank 1880–1904, ⚭ Paula Engels (1837–1919)
 Max von Oppenheim (1860–1946), diplomat and orientalist
 Emil (1862–1956), partner of the bank 1893–1912 ⚭ Maria Pergler von Perglas (1871–1959)
 Clara Maria Hubertina (1870–1959) ⚭ Guido Graf von Matuschka-Greiffenclau (1847–1924)
 Henry (1835–1912) partner of the bank ⚭ Isabella Georgina Butler
 Abraham (1804–1878), partner of the bank since 1828, nominated 1868 preußischer Freiherr in 1868 ⚭  (1811–1887)
 Eveline Oppenheim (1805–1886), married to Ferdinand von Kusserow
 
 Sophie von Kusserow (1869–1959)
 Karlfried Graf Dürckheim
  (1809–1889)
 Betty Oppenheim (Bertha Hertz) ⚭ Heinrich David Hertz (born as Hertz Hertz)
 Gustav Ferdinand Hertz (born as David Gustav Hertz) ⚭ Anna Elisabeth Pfefferkorn
 Heinrich Hertz
 Gustav Theodor Hertz ⚭ Auguste Arning
 Gustav Ludwig Hertz ⚭ Ellen Dihlmann
 Carl Hellmuth Hertz
 Hans Hertz

Notes

External links
 Oppenheimer at Jews of Frankfurt

German financial businesspeople
Jewish families
Banking families